The 1964 Australia Cup was the third season of the Australia Cup, which was the main national association football knockout cup competition in Australia.

Teams

Quarter-finals

Semi-finals

Replay

Final

References

Australia Cup
1964 in Australian soccer
Australia Cup (1962–1968) seasons